The Delft Bible (1477) is the first substantial Dutch Bible translation to be printed. It did not include the New Testament or the Psalms, which were already available in separate editions.

References

1477 books
Early printed Bibles
15th century in the Netherlands
15th-century Christian texts
Bible translations into Dutch
1470s in the Holy Roman Empire
1477 in Europe